Mateusz Czunkiewicz (born 16 December 1996) is a Polish volleyball player. At the professional club level, he plays for Ślepsk Malow Suwałki.

Honours

Clubs
 National championships
 2014/2015  Polish Cup, with Trefl Gdańsk
 2014/2015  Polish Championship, with Trefl Gdańsk
 2015/2016  Polish SuperCup, with Trefl Gdańsk

References

External links

 
 Player profile at PlusLiga.pl 
 Player profile at Volleybox.net

1996 births
Living people
People from Bartoszyce
Sportspeople from Warmian-Masurian Voivodeship
Polish men's volleyball players
Trefl Gdańsk players
BKS Visła Bydgoszcz players
Effector Kielce players
Stal Nysa players
Ślepsk Suwałki players
Liberos